William Lockyer Dennis (1853–1919) was a member of the Wisconsin State Assembly.

Biography
Dennis was born on July 19, 1853, in Carrington, Nottinghamshire, England. He moved to Milwaukee, Wisconsin in 1868.

Career
Dennis was elected to the Assembly in 1888. He was a Republican.

References

1853 births
1919 deaths
People from Nottingham
English emigrants to the United States
19th-century English people
Republican Party members of the Wisconsin State Assembly
Politicians from Milwaukee